Coolmeen, formerly called Kilfiddane, is a Roman Catholic parish in County Clare, Ireland.

Location
The parish lies in the southeast of the barony of Clonderalaw.
It extends from the River Fergus estuary westward along the Shannon Estuary and north to the head of Clonderlaw bay. The road from Ennis to Kilrush runs through the parish.

The original name of the parish, Kilfidane, is derived from a streamlet called Feadán in Irish. It runs near where the old church stood.

Facilities
The parish of Coolmeen is in the Roman Catholic Diocese of Killaloe. 
The parish has two churches, St Benedict's in Coolmeen and St Mary's in Cranny.

References

Towns and villages in County Clare
Parishes of the Roman Catholic Diocese of Killaloe